Club Balonmano Porriño, also known as Godoy Maceira Porriño for sponsorship reasons, is a Spanish women's handball club from O Porriño, Pontevedra, in División de Honor since 2011.

Season to season

Team

Current squad
Squad for the 2020–21 season

Goalkeepers
 12  Fátima Ayelén Rosalez
 99  Begoña Otero
   Estela Carrera
Wingers
LW
 13  Soraia Lopes
 24  Sandra Fernández
RW
 5  Ana Cerqueira Rodrigues
 25  Carme Castro
Line players
   Arima López
 7  Alicia Campo
 17  Alba Dapena

Back players
LB
   Monica Soares
 11  Inés Hernández
CB
 14  Aitana Santomé
 19  Anthía Espiñeira
RB
   Erica Tavares
 21  Sarai Sanmartín

Notable players
  Alicia Fernández
  Sara Gil de la Vega

References

External links

 BM Porriño at RFEBM

Spanish handball clubs
Sports teams in Galicia (Spain)
Province of Pontevedra
Handball clubs established in 1987